The 2016–17 season of Flamengo Basketball is the 97th season of the club, and the club's 9th in the Novo Basquete Brasil (NBB). They played the season as the defending champions of the league, holding four consecutive titles.

Offseason

Pre-season

The season

Roster

Depth chart

Transactions

In

|}

Out

|}

Pre-season games

Super Four Rio-Nordeste Tournament

* First basketball game between the two rivals in 9 years

Competitions

Rio de Janeiro State Championship

Regular season standings

Regular season games

* First official basketball game between the two rivals in 9 years

Semifinals

(1) Flamengo vs. (4) Botafogo 
Game 1

Game 2

Finals

(1) Flamengo vs. (2) Vasco da Gama
Game 1

Game 2

Game 3

2016-17 NBB

Regular season standings

Regular season games

FIBA Americas League

Preliminary round

Season records

Player statistics

NBB regular season

References

External links
Official club website 
Flamengo Team Profile at New Basket Brazil 
Flamengo Team Profile at Latinbasket.com 

Flamengo Basketball seasons
Flamengo Basketball